Erionota thrax, the palm redeye or the banana skipper, is a species of butterfly belonging to the family Hesperiidae. It is found from India, through south-eastern Asia to Papua New Guinea. In the north it is found up to southern China. It is an introduced species on various Pacific islands, including the Solomon Islands and Hawaii. It has also been recorded from Mauritius. 

The wingspan is 70–77 mm. There are multiple generations per year.

The larvae feed on the leaves of Musa species, especially Musa textilis. It has also been recorded on Cocos nucifera and other palm species.

The rolls in banana leaves that E. thrax larvae create when feeding have been used as overwintering shelters for wasp species Polistes japonicus in Okinawa, Japan.

Description

Subspecies
 Erionota thrax thrax (Indonesia)
 Erionota thrax mindana Evans, 1941 (southern and central Philippines)
 Erionota thrax hasdrubal Fruhstorfer, 1910 (northern Moluccas)
 Erionota thrax alexandra De Long et Treadaway, 1993 (Luzon, northern Philippines)

References

Erionotini
Butterflies of Asia
Butterflies of Oceania
Butterflies of Indochina
Butterflies of Indonesia
Butterflies of Malaysia
Butterflies of Singapore
Lepidoptera of New Guinea
Lepidoptera of Papua New Guinea
Lepidoptera of the Philippines
Agricultural pest insects
Butterflies described in 1767
Taxa named by Carl Linnaeus